is a Japanese football player. He is currently playing for Yadanarbon FC.

Career

He first joined the S.League in 2011, playing for Albirex Niigata FC (Singapore), captaining the side. He won the 2011 Singapore League Cup in penalty shootouts against Hougang United after a goalless draw at the end of Extra Time. The first silverware in the team's history. Shimpei made the second attempt; Jordan Webb's miss proved costly.

In 2012, together with Tatsuro Inui, the pair signed for Singapore Armed Forces FC (currently known as Warriors FC) on 2-year contracts. He won the 2012 RHB Singapore Cup in the cup final against Tampines Rovers, with the aid of an Erwan Gunawan injury time winner, Shimpei scored a 78th-minute equaliser in the process. His second silverware in as many years in the S.League. However, he was left out of the 2013 AFC Cup squad due to the limitations on foreign players quota.

At the end of his contract with Warriors FC, Shimpei went on for trials in various countries in the region. One of which is Perak FA from the Malaysia Super League. On 31 January 2014, it was announced on his personal Facebook page that he has signed for Yadanarbon FC. He made his Myanmar National League debut on 1 February 2014, against Chin United, he was part of the starting lineup.

Honours
Singapore League Cup
 2011: Champions
Singapore Cup
 2012: Champions

References

External links
 
 SAFFC Profile

1984 births
Living people
Japanese footballers
Japan Soccer College players
Albirex Niigata Singapore FC players
Warriors FC players
Yadanarbon F.C. players
Singapore Premier League players
Expatriate footballers in Singapore
Association football midfielders